Tan Ning (born 28 May 1990) is a Chinese football player.

Club career
He used to play for an amateur club Nanjing Tehu of Nanjing City League in 2007.

References

External links
Player profile at Sodasoccer.com

1990 births
Living people
Sportspeople from Nanjing
Chinese footballers
Footballers from Jiangsu
Guangzhou F.C. players
Chinese Super League players
Association football goalkeepers